Paris 1900 is a 1947 French documentary film directed by Nicole Védrès, and entered into the 1947 Cannes Film Festival.

Cast
 Claude Dauphin as Récitant / Narrator (French version) (voice)
 Mistinguett
 Monty Woolley as Narrator, US version (voice)

References

External links

1947 films
1940s French-language films
French documentary films
French black-and-white films
Films directed by Nicole Védrès
1947 documentary films
Black-and-white documentary films
Louis Delluc Prize winners
Documentary films about Paris
1940s French films